Anastasia Avramidou (born 2000) is a Greek chess player who holds the FIDE title of Woman International Master (WIM, 2016).

Biography
In 2012, Anastasia Avramidou won Greek Youth Chess Championships for girls in U12 age group. She repeatedly represented Greece at the European Youth Chess Championships and World Youth Chess Championships in different age groups, where she won two gold medals: in 2012, in Prague at the European Youth Chess Championship in the U12 girls age group, and in 2014, in Batumi at the European Youth Chess Championship in the U14 girls age group. Also she two times won World School Chess Championships in different age groups: in 2009, in the U09 girls age group, and in 2013, in the U13 girls age group. In 2014, Anastasia Avramidou won European School Chess Championship in the U15 girls age group.

Anastasia Avramidou played for Greece in the Women's Chess Olympiads:
 In 2016, at third board in the 42nd Chess Olympiad (women) in Baku (+5, =4, -1),
 In 2018, at third board in the 43rd Chess Olympiad (women) in Batumi (+5, =4, -1).

Anastasia Avramidou played for Greece in the European Team Chess Championships:
 In 2017, at fourth board in the 12th European Team Chess Championship (women) in Crete (+4, =3, -2).

In 2016, she was awarded the FIDE Woman International Master (WIM) title.

References

External links

2000 births
Living people
Greek female chess players
Chess Woman International Masters
Chess Olympiad competitors